Brill and Ludgershall railway station was a railway station serving the villages of Brill and Ludgershall in Buckinghamshire. It was on what is now known as the Chiltern Main Line.

History 

Brill and Ludgershall was one of six new stations that the Great Western Railway provided when it opened the high-speed Bicester cut-off line between Princes Risborough and Kings Sutton in 1910. The line became part of the Western Region of British Railways on nationalisation in 1948. British Railways closed the station in 1963.

References

External links 
 Station site today
 The station on navigable 1946 O. S. map
Plan of line

Disused railway stations in Buckinghamshire
Former Great Western Railway stations
Railway stations in Great Britain opened in 1910
Railway stations in Great Britain closed in 1963